PT Indomobil Sukses Internasional Tbk, known as Indomobil Group, is a car and motor vehicle manufacturer located in Jakarta, Indonesia. It was founded in 1976 by the unification of the two former competitors PT Indohero and the original incarnation of PT Indomobil. The company operates plants in Jakarta, Bekasi and Purwakarta.

Subsidiaries
The Indomobil Group is operating following manufacturing plants, joint ventures and distributing rights:

 PT Garuda Mataram Motor (Volkswagen and Audi) (99.93%)
 PT Hino Motors Sales Indonesia (Hino Motors) (40%)
 PT Hino Motors Finance Indonesia (Hino Motors) (36.79%)
 PT Hino Motors Manufacturing Indonesia (Hino Motors) (10%)
 PT Indomobil Wahana Trada (Citroën) (100%)
 PT Indotruck Utama (Volvo Trucks and Volvo Buses) (74.99%)
 PT Indo Traktor Utama (Renault Trucks) (74.99%)
 PT JLM Auto Indonesia (Jaguar Land Rover, a JV with Inchcape, which owns 60%). (Effectively 28% owned by Indomobil Group) (40% owned by Indomobil Jasa Lintas Raya [IJLR] which is 69.99% owned by Indomobil Group) 
PT Kreta Indo Artha (Kia) (60%)
PT National Assemblers (assembly plant for various brands) (99.97%)
PT Nissan Motor Distributor Indonesia (Nissan) (74.99%)
PT NFSI Financial Services (formerly PT Nissan Financial Services Indonesia) (Nissan) (Effectively 82.77% owned by Indomobil Group) (90% owned by PT Indomobil Multi Jasa Tbk [IMJ] which is 91.97% owned by Indomobil Group)
PT Nissan Motor Indonesia (Nissan) (1%)
PT Suzuki Indomobil Motor (Suzuki) (4.55%)
PT Suzuki Indomobil Sales (Suzuki) (5.5%)
PT Suzuki Finance Indonesia (Suzuki) (0.92%)
 PT Vantec Indomobil Logistics (20%)

Former marques 
 Chery (PT Unicor Prima Motor)
Datsun (PT Nissan Motor Indonesia)
 Foton (PT Indobuana Autoraya)
 Great Wall (PT Indomobil Multi Trada)
 Infiniti (PT Nissan Motor Indonesia)
 Marvia (PT Marvia Graha Motor)
 Mazda (PT Mazda Indonesia Manufacturing, PT Aneka Motor, PT National Motors, PT Unicor Prima Motor)
 Renault (PT Auto Euro Indonesia)
Ssangyong (PT Indobuana Autoraya)
 Volvo (PT Indoswedish, PT Indobuana Autoraya, PT Central Sole Agency)

Commissioners and Managements
Since July 2014:
 President Commissioner: Soebronto Laras
 Vice President Commissioner: Pranata Hajadi
 Commissioners: Gunadi Sindhuwinata, Eugene Cho Park, Soegeng Sarjadi, Hanandi Rahardja, Mohamad Jusuf Hamka
 President Director: Jusak Kertowidjojo
 Directors: Bambang Subijanto, Josef Utamin, Santiago Navarro, Alex Sutisna, Evensius Go

References

External links
 

Car manufacturers of Indonesia
Manufacturing companies based in Jakarta
Vehicle manufacturing companies established in 1976
Indonesian companies established in 1976
1993 initial public offerings
Companies listed on the Indonesia Stock Exchange